Mojoj mami umesto maturske slike u izlogu (trans. To My Mother instead of the Prom Photo in the Shop Window) is the first studio album released by former Yugoslav rock band Rani Mraz.

In 1998, the album was polled as the 44th on the list of 100 greatest Yugoslav rock and pop albums in the book YU 100: najbolji albumi jugoslovenske rok i pop muzike (YU 100: The Best albums of Yugoslav pop and rock music).

Recording
Before the album recording Rani Mraz went through several lineup changes, and at the time of the recording, Đorđe Balašević and Biljana Krstić were the only official members of the band, so Mojoj mami umesto maturske slike u izlogu was recorded with studio musicians: bass guitarist Bojan Hreljac, drummer Vladimir Furduj, keyboardist Sloba Mаrković and saxophonist Mića Marković. Being a fan of Korni Grupa, Balašević entrusted the production to Korni Grupa former member Josip Boček, who also played guitar on the album. The album also featured violinist Jovan Kolundžija, on the track "Sve je dobro kad se dobro svrši".

Track listing
All the songs written by Đorđe Balašević, except where noted.

Reissues
The album was rereleased on CD in 1999 by the Slovenian record label Taped Pictures. The Taped Pictures release featured three bonus tracks from Žetva (Balašević's former band) and Rani Mraz 7-inch singles: "U razdeljak te ljubim" ("I Lay a Kiss on Your Parting"), "Prva ljubav" ("First Love") and "Računajte na nas" ("Count on Us").

Legacy
In 1998, the album was polled as the 44th on the list of 100 greatest Yugoslav rock and pop albums in the book YU 100: najbolji albumi jugoslovenske rok i pop muzike (YU 100: The Best albums of Yugoslav pop and rock music).

Personnel
Đorđe Balašević - vocals
Biljana Krstić - vocals

Additional personnel
Josip Boček - guitar
Bojan Hreljac - bass guitar
Vladimir Furduj - drums
Sloba Marković - keyboard
Mića Marković - saxophone
Jovan Kolundžija - violin

References

Mojoj mami umesto maturske slike u izlogu at Discogs
 EX YU ROCK enciklopedija 1960-2006,  Janjatović Petar;

External links
Mojoj mami umesto maturske slike u izlogu at Discogs

Rani Mraz albums
1979 albums
PGP-RTB albums